Desert Financial Credit Union is a credit union based in Phoenix, Arizona, that operates 47 branches and service centers throughout Coconino, Gila, Maricopa, Pinal, and Yavapai counties and now statewide in Arizona. Desert Financial remains federally insured by the NCUA (National Credit Union Administration) and in addition will be regulated by the Arizona Department of Financial Institutions, which regulates state chartered credit unions in Arizona. Desert Financial is the largest credit union in Arizona, managing nearly $8.5 billion in assets as of October 2022.

History
Desert Financial was originally named Arizona Educational Association (AEA) #1 Federal Credit Union and was chartered in 1939 to serve the financial needs of area teachers. In 1972, the credit union rebranded to Desert Schools Credit Union to better define their niche market. In 1996, they expanded their charter to serve three counties in Arizona and disregarded vocation as a membership qualifier. In 2020, Desert Financial became a statewide charter.

In 2018, the Desert Schools Credit Union was renamed Desert Financial Credit Union, in order to address misconceptions that it still only served members of the education community. The rebranding was promoted during a commercial aired locally during Super Bowl LII, featuring Phoenix native Alice Cooper and playing upon his band's 1972 song "School's Out".

In 2019, Desert Financial bought the naming rights to the Arizona State University arena and renamed it to the Desert Financial Arena. The agreement cost $1.5 million per year for 5 years.

Membership
Desert Financial currently serves approximately 400,000 members. Individuals who live, work, worship, or attend school in the following Arizona counties may join Desert Financial Credit Union:

Coconino
Gila
Maricopa
Pinal
Yavapai
Cochise (Online banking only)
La Paz (Online banking only)
Mohave (Online banking only)
Navajo (Online banking only)
Pima (Online banking only)
Yuma (Online banking only)

Additionally, family members of current or eligible members may also join.

Services
Desert Financial Credit Union offers a variety of financial products, including:

 Savings and Checking Accounts
 Savings Certificate
 IRAs
 Home Equity Loans
 Mortgage Loans
 Business Loans
 Consumer and Business Platinum, Bonus, and Bonus Rewards Plus Visa Credit Cards
 Vehicle and Watercraft Loans
 Direct Deposit
 Money Market
 Internet and Mobile Banking
 Wills and Trusts

Community involvement

Desert Financial donates an average of $5 million annually to local charities and causes, and their employees also donate and volunteer in the community on a regular basis. In 2018, the credit union established the Desert Financial Foundation as their first nonprofit entity. Halfway through 2018, Desert Financial donated $6.27 million out of a goal of $7 million for the year.

References

External links
Official website

Desert Financial Credit Union Annual Reports

Companies based in Phoenix, Arizona
Banks established in 1939
Credit unions based in Arizona
1939 establishments in Arizona